The 1989 E3 Harelbeke was the 32nd edition of the E3 Harelbeke cycle race and was held on 25 March 1989. The race started and finished in Harelbeke. The race was won by Eddy Planckaert of the AD Renting team.

General classification

References

1989 in Belgian sport
1989